Clarence C. Wiley (October 25, 1883 – March 2, 1908) was an American pharmacist from Oskaloosa, Iowa who won fame for his folk rag entitled "Car-Barlick-Acid Rag".

According to Census records, he was one of five children born to Benson and Ella Wiley.

Wiley copyrighted his composition on August 9, 1901.  Giles Brothers purchased his rag in 1904 and sold it in turn to Jerome H. Remick and Company in 1907.  It was published as sheet music and also in the form of a player piano roll.

He died in 1908 from a morphine overdose and was buried in Keokuk County, Iowa.

See also
 List of ragtime composers

References

External links

 MIDI file of Car-Balick-Acid Rag derived from a scanned player piano roll
 

1883 births
1908 deaths
American male composers
American composers
People from Bellaire, Ohio
People from Oskaloosa, Iowa
Ragtime composers
American pharmacists
19th-century American male musicians
20th-century American male musicians